Uddingston West railway station served the town of Uddingston in South Lanarkshire on the Glasgow, Bothwell, Hamilton and Coatbridge Railway between Shettleston and Hamilton.

History
Uddingston West was opened in 1883 on the Glasgow, Bothwell, Hamilton and Coatbridge Railway. It was closed as a wartime economy measure between 1917 and 1919. Uddingston West was closed on 4 July 1955. The line closed to freight traffic on 4 October 1964.

Services

References

Notes

Sources
 
 

Disused railway stations in North Lanarkshire
Former North British Railway stations
Railway stations in Great Britain opened in 1883
Railway stations in Great Britain closed in 1917
Railway stations in Great Britain opened in 1919
Railway stations in Great Britain closed in 1955
Bothwell and Uddingston